Luiz Gustavo Oliveira da Silva (born 8 March 2002), or simply Luizão, is a Brazilian professional footballer who plays as a centre-back for English club West Ham United.

Professional career
Luizão made his professional debut with São Paulo at the 2022 Copa Sudamericana 0–0 draw against Everton, on 5 May 2022.

On 18 December 2022, it was announced that Luizão would be joining English Premier League club West Ham United when the English transfer window opened on 1 January 2023, after an undisclosed transfer fee was agreed.

Career statistics

Club

Notes

References

External links
Luizão at playmakerstats.com (English version of ogol.com.br)

2002 births
Living people
Association football defenders
Brazilian footballers
São Paulo FC players
Footballers from São Paulo

West Ham United F.C. players
Expatriate footballers in England
Brazilian expatriate sportspeople in England
Brazilian expatriate sportspeople